Lorenzo Iorio, born in Bari in 1971, is an Italian physicist working in general relativity,  gravitation and related topics in astronomy and astrophysics.

Biography 
Iorio is editor-in-chief of the peer-reviewed scientific journal Universe, published by MDPI. In May 2019, he qualified as a Full Professor in Astronomy, Astrophysics, Physics of the Earth and Planets, and Theoretical Physics. In September 2019, he qualified as an Associate Professor in the same fields.
Iorio is a member of the International Astronomical Union.

Selected publications
Iorio has published over 240 peer-reviewed papers and 1 co-edited book. His works include the following.

References

External links
"Lense-Thirring-Effekt: Rotierende Raumzeit gemessen?" From Welt der Physik on the Lense-Thirring effect on the Mars' probe Mars Global Surveyor.
"Giovane ricercatore di Bari batte la Nasa" From La Repubblica on the Lense-Thirring effect on the Mars' probe Mars Global Surveyor.
"Loner stakes claim to gravity prize" From New Scientist On the Lense-Thirring effect on the Mars' probe Mars Global Surveyor.
"Modified gravity fails at long distances" From Physics World on modified models of gravity.
"Sun's appetite for dark matter may affect Earth's orbit" From Physics World on the Earth's fate and the expanding Sun.
"The Sun Will Eventually Engulf Earth--Maybe" From Scientific American on the Earth's fate and the expanding Sun.
"Constraining the Orbits of Planet X and Nemesis" From Universe today on the Planet X.
"Estimating the orbit of Planet X" From MIT Technology Review on the Planet X.

Italian astrophysicists
21st-century Italian physicists
21st-century Italian male writers
Academic journal editors
Living people
Year of birth missing (living people)